Westbury DMU Servicing Depot is a traction maintenance depot located in Westbury, Wiltshire, England. The depot is situated on the Reading to Taunton line and is near Westbury station.

The depot code is WY.

History 
Class 08 shunters were allocated to the depot between 1961 and 1968.

Present 
As of 2016, the depot has no allocation. It is, instead, a stabling point for Great Western Railway Class 150 Sprinters.

References 

Rail transport in Wiltshire
Railway depots in England
Westbury, Wiltshire